Liangbaosi is a town in Jiaxiang, Jining, in southwestern Shandong province, China. The town is a combination of 79 villages with a population of 90,000 people, according to July 2013 statistics.

References

Township-level divisions of Shandong
Jining